"Seven Seas" is a phrase used to encompass all the world's oceans in general.

Seven seas may also refer to:

Companies and brands
 Seven Seas Entertainment, an American publisher of manga and light novels
 Seven Seas (company), a UK vitamin brand owned by Merck KGaA (now by P&G)
 Seven Seas, a sublabel of Japanese record company King Records
 Regent Seven Seas Cruises, a luxury cruise line

Transportation
 Douglas DC-7C "Seven Seas", an extended-range variant of the DC-7 aircraft
 Seven Seas - a passenger liner
 Seven Seas Navigator - a cruise ship

Music 
 "Seven Seas" (song), a 1984 single by Echo & the Bunnymen, also on their LP Ocean Rain
 "Seven Seas", a song by the Norwegian rock/metal band TNT
 "Seven Seas of Rhye", a song by Queen
 "Seven Seas", the 2011 album by Avishai Cohen and the title track
 "Sailing on the Seven Seas", a 1991 single by Orchestral Manoeuvres in the Dark
 "Seven Seas (Emancipator album)"
 Seven Seas (album), a 2005 compilation album by Echo & the Bunnymen

Other
 Seven Seas Marine Life Park, a defunct animal theme park in Arlington, Texas
 Seven Seas Residence, former residence of Republic of China President Chiang Ching-kuo
 Seven Seas Salad Dressing, a Kraft-owned line of salad dressing
 The Seven Seas (poetry collection), a volume of poetry by Rudyard Kipling

See also 

 Sinbad: Legend of the Seven Seas, a 2003 animated film